The women's 4 × 100 metre freestyle relay competition at the 2002 Pan Pacific Swimming Championships took place on August 24 at the Yokohama International Swimming Pool.  The last champion was the United States.

This race consisted of eight lengths of the pool. Each of the four swimmers completed two lengths of the pool. The first swimmer had to touch the wall before the second could leave the starting block.

Records
Prior to this competition, the existing world and Pan Pacific records were as follows:

Results
All times are in minutes and seconds.

Heats
Heats weren't performed, as only eight teams had entered.

Final 
The final was held on August 24.

References

4 × 100 metre freestyle relay
2002 Pan Pacific Swimming Championships
2002 in women's swimming